Rivedoux-Plage is a commune in the Charente-Maritime department in southwestern France. It is situated on the Île de Ré.

The commune includes the beach of Sablanceau. People who live on the island are called the Rivedousais and the Rivedousaises.

Population

Geography
The Rivedoux-Plage includes a small town and a small port, and is located on the eastern end of the Ile de Ré on the coast, across from La Rochelle and bordered by the Pertuis Breton and the Pertuis d'Antioche.

The southeast includes a large sandy beach which faces La Rochelle and the islanad of Aix.

Economy
Main activities:
 agriculture: potatoes, asparagus, vines;
 oyster farming, boating, fishing;
tourism (accommodation: two hotels, two campsites, guesthouses, seasonal rentals).

History

 Rivedoux was built as a seigneury on January 15, 1480, under the request of Messire Jean Arnaud, squire, and under the permission of the commendatory abbot of the Notre-Dame-de-Sainte-Marie-des-Châtellers abbey, Louis de La Trémoille.
 In September 12, 1562, Jean-Pierre Arnaud-Bruneau obtained the right to have a port in his lordship, and he created the port the following year.
 In 1953 Jean Arnaud-Bruneau, the son of the previous Bruneau, built some of the first houses in Riverdoux around his manor
In 1595, he added the entire Pointe de Sablanceaux to his estate.

Local Culture and Heritage

Places and monuments 

 The Ile de Ré bridge connects the island to the mainland at Sablanceaux in Rivedoux-Plage, at a place called La Repentie in La Pallice
 The Chauveau lighthouse, located at the southern tip of the Ile de Ré, which is accessible on foot at low tide
 The redoubt of Rivedoux, a fortification built in 1674 by Vauban
 The Sablanceaux battery
 The House of the Count of Hastrel and its tower
 The tidal mill, built by Mr. Boulineau in 1845
 Surf and windsurf spots on the south coast
 Kitesurf spots on the northern coast
 The north beach. A large beach forming the bay of Rivedoux, stretching from the Ile de Ré bridge to the port
 The southern beach, stretching from the Ile de Ré bridge to the Pointe de Chauveau. The southern beach includes wheelchair access, and access for people with reduced mobility and impaired vision

See also 
Communes of the Charente-Maritime department

References

External links
Les gentilés de Charente-Maritime

Communes of Charente-Maritime
Île de Ré
Charente-Maritime communes articles needing translation from French Wikipedia
Populated coastal places in France